Marion is a city in and the county seat of Marion County, Ohio, United States. The population was 35,999 at the 2020 census, slightly down from 36,837 at the 2010 census. It is the largest city in Marion County and the principal city of the Marion, OH Micropolitan Statistical Area. It is also part of the larger Columbus–Marion–Zanesville, OH Combined Statistical Area, which has 2,481,525 people according to the US Census 2017 estimate. 

President Warren G. Harding, a former owner of the Marion Star, was a resident of Marion for much of his adult life and is buried at Harding Tomb. The city and its development were closely related to industrialist Edward Huber and his extensive business interests. The city is home to several historic properties, some listed on the National Register of Historic Places listings in Marion County, Ohio.

Marion currently styles itself as "America's Workforce Development Capital" given public–private educational partnerships and coordination of educational venues, from four and two–year college programs to vocational and technical training and skill certification programs. The mayor of Marion is Scott Schertzer.

History

Marion was laid out in 1822, and is named in honor of General Francis Marion. It was incorporated as a village by the Legislature of Ohio in its 1829-1830 session. On March 15, 1830, Marion elected Nathan Peters as its first Mayor.

Marion was one of Ohio's major industrial centers until the 1970s. Products of the Marion Steam Shovel Company (later Marion Power Shovel) were used by contractors to build the Panama Canal, the Hoover Dam, and dug the Holland Tunnel under the Hudson River. In 1911, 80% of the nation's steam shovel and heavy-duty earth moving equipment was manufactured in Marion, Ohio.  NASA contracted with Marion Power Shovel to manufacture the crawler-transporters that moved the assembled Saturn V rockets (used for Project Apollo) to the launch pad.

The city is a rail center for CSX, and Norfolk Southern. Marion has long been a center of grain based (corn and popcorn) snack and other products given its close proximity to nearby growing regions in adjacent counties (ConAgra had a major presence in Marion for decades, and Wyandot Snacks has been active in Marion since the 1960s). Whirlpool Corporation is the largest employer in the city operating the largest clothes dryer manufacturing facility in the world. Nucor Steel's facility in Marion is the largest producer of rebar and signpost in Ohio.

Marion, like many small American cities, has progressed in its sensibilities around race. During the 1800s Marion served as a stop in the Underground Railroad known in Ohio as the River to Lake Freedom Trail. In 1839, a Black man, Bill Mitchell, was accused of being a fugitive slave in Marion and was freed in the ensuing legal case. A number of Virginians seeking to reclaim him for his owner brawled in the courtroom in response. The former slave was spirited away by Marion abolitionists and he ultimately made his way to Canada. In February 1919, nearly all of Marion's African American residents were driven out of town in response to an attack on a white woman. Marion subsequently became a sundown town, where African Americans were prevented from residing. President Harding, in spite of criticisms, employed African Americans at the Marion Star. In the 1920s, Marion city and Marion County supported Native American Jim Thorpe and his efforts to field an all–Native American NFL team called the Oorang Indians. In the 1970s, Dr. Dalsukh Madia, an Indian American, became head of the Smith Center at Marion General Hospital (now part of OhioHealth).

Today, people of color constitute 14% of Marion's population. In July 2020 the Marion City Council, led by Mayor Scott Schertzer, unanimously passed a resolution vowing to promote racial equality and justice for its African American community.

Geography and Geology

Marion is located at  (40.586579, -83.126404).

Marion is located in the Till plain geological area of Ohio. The flat land was formed (12,000-14,000 years ago) of glacial till that formed when a sheet of ice became detached from the main body of a glacier and melted in place, depositing the sediments it carried. Two small glacial lake plains are located to the west of the city. The county has gently rolling moraine hills left from the retreating glaciers.

Because of the glacial action, the soils are highly productive for agriculture. The soils are blount, pewamo and glynwood.

Marion occupies most of Marion Township, which is located just outside the city limits.

Demographics

2010 census
As of the census of 2010, there were 36,837 people, 12,868 households, and 8,175 families residing in the city. The racial makeup of the city was 86.7% White, 9.6% African American, 0.2% Native American, 0.4% Asian, 1.1% from other races, and 2.1% from two or more races. Hispanic or Latino of any race were 3.0% of the population.

There were 12,868 households, of which 33.5% had children under the age of 18 living with them, 40.0% were married couples living together, 17.1% had a female householder with no husband present, 6.4% had a male householder with no wife present, and 36.5% were non-families. 30.4% of all households were made up of individuals, and 12.7% had someone living alone who was 65 years of age or older. The average household size was 2.45 and the average family size was 3.00.

The median age in the city was 37.3 years. 22.2% of residents were under the age of 18; 9.9% were between the ages of 18 and 24; 28.7% were from 25 to 44; 26.6% were from 45 to 64; and 12.6% were 65 years of age or older. The gender makeup of the city was 54.9% male and 45.1% female.

2000 census
As of the census of 2000, there were 35,318 people, 13,551 households, and 8,821 families residing in the city. The population density was 3,111.6 people per square mile (1,201.4/km2). There were 14,713 housing units at an average density of 1,296.8 per square mile (500.5/km2). The racial makeup of the city was 90.40% White, 7.01% African American, 0.20% Native American, 0.54% Asian, 0.01% Pacific Islander, 0.64% from other races, and 1.20% from two or more races. Hispanic or Latino of any race were 1.34% of the population.

There were 13,551 households, out of which 31.6% had children under the age of 18 living with them, 46.3% were married couples living together, 14.1% had a female householder with no husband present, and 34.9% were non-families. 29.3% of all households were made up of individuals, and 12.0% had someone living alone who was 65 years of age or older. The average household size was 2.44 and the average family size was 3.00.

In the city the population was spread out, with 25.2% under the age of 18, 9.3% from 18 to 24, 30.8% from 25 to 44, 21.5% from 45 to 64, and 13.2% who were 65 years of age or older. The median age was 35 years. For every 100 females, there were 102.3 males. For every 100 females age 18 and over, there were 101.5 males.

The median income for a household in the city was $33,124, and the median income for a family was $40,000. Males had a median income of $31,126 versus $22,211 for females. The per capita income for the city was $16,247. About 10.9% of families and 13.8% of the population were below the poverty line, including 20.2% of those under age 18 and 6.9% of those age 65 or over.

Economy

Overview
While Marion and the surrounding area is generally rural, manufacturing is a significant source of employment. The county is a well-positioned rail transportation hub with access to U.S. 23, serving as a major connection to Interstate 80 and Interstate 90 through Detroit and Toledo to the north, and connections to Interstate 71 and Interstate 70 through nearby Columbus.

One of the largest intermodal freight transport facilities in the country is located in Marion. It provides rail and local truck delivery services for Whirlpool Corporation, International Paper and major automotive parts manufacturers, among many others.

Whirlpool's dryer manufacturing facility in Marion is the largest in the world, producing over 20,000 dryers daily.

The unemployment rate for Marion County as of July 2019 was 4.4%.

Largest employers
According to the Marion Chamber of Commerce  and Marion CanDo (the economic development office of Marion), the largest industrial employers in the city are:

Recent developments
Like most of Central Ohio, Marion has been experiencing an economic resurgence since the end of the Great Recession.  Ohio is the second largest steel producing state in America, and local employer Nucor Steel, whose Marion facility is the largest manufacturer of rebar and signposts in Ohio, announced in March 2017 it was spending $85 million on a modernization program. Also in 2017 POET announced it was spending $120 million to more than double its ethanol manufacturing capacity to 150 million gallons a year.

MarionMade!, an advertising campaign, is designed to promote positive news about the area's people, places, products, and programs. The MarionMade! advertising program won a 2017 PRism Award from the Central Ohio Chapter of the Public Relations Society of America (PRSA).

Performing arts
The Palace Theatre (c. 1928) is a 1440-seat atmospheric theatre designed by John Eberson in the Spanish Colonial Revival architecture style. It has been in continuous operation since it opened on August 30, 1928. Restored in 1975, it is one of only 16 remaining Eberson-designed atmospheric theatres still in operation in the United States today. Eberson designed the theatre for Young Amusement Company, at an original cost of one-half million dollars ($8.6 million in 2023 dollars). Inside, the auditorium resembles an outdoor palace courtyard, complete with a blue sky and twinkling stars. It has many original Pietro Caproni sculpture castings. The theatre is registered on the National Register of Historic Places. Adjoining the theatre is the May Pavilion, a two-story event space for chamber orchestra concerts, jazz and soft rock bands, amateur theatre productions of plays and small cast musicals, wedding receptions, graduation parties and meetings.

The theatre presents touring artists and children's theatre. During the off-season and at other times during the year when the theatre would be otherwise dark, non-equity amateur theater musicals, community band concerts and high school productions are presented on the main stage and in the smaller May Pavilion. The theatre also exhibits current motion pictures.

Museums
Heritage Hall & the Old Post Office
The Old U.S. Post Office (Marion, Ohio) was built in 1910. It is listed on the National Register of Historic Places (1990). The building is now used as the Heritage Hall museum of the Marion County Historical Society. The museum is dedicated to the preservation of Marion County, Ohio history.

Wyandot Popcorn Museum
Heritage Hall is also home of the Wyandot Popcorn Museum, the "only museum in the world dedicated to popcorn and its associated memorabilia." Opened in 1982 prior to the second Popcorn Festival, the museum's collection consists of classic antique poppers made by Cretors, Dunbar, Kingery, Holcomb and Hoke, Long-Eakin, Excel, Manley, Burch, Star, Bartholomew, Stutsman and Advance. Not only is it one of only two Popcorn Museums in the world, it also represents the largest collection of restored popcorn antiques.

Warren G. Harding House
A national presidential site, the Harding Home was the residence of Warren G. Harding, twenty-ninth president of the United States. Harding and his future wife, Florence, designed the Queen Anne Style house in 1890, a year before their marriage. They were married in the home and lived there for 30 years before his election to the presidency. Like James A. Garfield, an earlier U.S. president from Ohio, Harding conducted his election campaign mainly from the house's expansive front porch. During the 3-month front porch campaign, over 600,000 people traveled to the Harding Home to listen to the candidate speak. Harding paid $1,000 to have a Sears catalog house built behind his home so newspaper reporters had workspace to type their stories. The press house is also open to the public. The site is being expanded to include a Presidential Center for Harding, expected to be opened in 2020, the 100th anniversary of Harding's election to the Presidency.

Huber Machinery Museum
This museum contains examples of Edward Huber's early steam and gasoline tractors and road-building equipment. Huber Manufacturing introduced a thresher in 1875, a steam traction engine in 1898, its first motor graders in the 1920s, a primitive hydraulic control in 1926, and the first Maintainer, a tractor-sized integral motor grader, in 1943. Other Huber products included wheel tractors, agricultural equipment, and three-wheel, tandem and pneumatic rollers.

Marion Union Station and Museum
More than 100 trains pass by Union Station every day. The museum showcases an impressive collection of memorabilia and the AC Tower, which was once the main switching facility for the Erie Railroad, Marion Division. During World War II, thousands of soldiers passed through Union Station on their way to Europe.

Annual events and fairs
Marion is home to the Marion Popcorn Festival, an annual event that is held in downtown Marion in September, the weekend following Labor Day. The Marion County Fair is held every year in Marion during the first week of July. Saturday in the Park is a children's festival that is held each year in Lincoln Park.

Marion is also home to Buckeye Chuck, Ohio's official weather-predicting and State Groundhog known for predicting the arrival of spring on Groundhog Day (February 2).

Media
The Marion Star, founded in 1877 and once owned by Warren Harding, is owned by Gannett. It is published daily and is the city's only newspaper.

Among Marion's radio stations are WMRN-FM (94.3 FM) country music station, WMRN (1490 AM) news/talk (iHeartRadio), WOSB (91.1 FM) NPR News and classical music station, WYNT (95.9 FM) adult contemporary station, and WDIF-LP blues music station.

WOCB-CD is an independent Christian inspirational low-power television station on digital UHF channel 39, broadcasting local church services and programs and public events throughout central Ohio.

Sports
The Oorang Indians, a traveling NFL team based in nearby LaRue, played their only true "home" game in Marion in 1923. It is the former home of the Marion Blue Racers, an indoor football team in X-League Indoor Football; the Marion Mayhem, also an indoor football team in the CIFL; and a professional ice hockey team, the Marion Barons, which played in the International Hockey League during the 1953–54 season.

Marion was home to numerous minor league baseball teams between 1900 and 1951, including the Marion Senators, Marion Presidents, Marion Cardinals and Marion Cubs. Future U.S. President Warren G. Harding was a part owner of the Marion Diggers, who played as members of the Class D level Ohio State League from 1908 to 1912.

Marion has been home to numerous individual and team high school state championships. In the early 1980s, Tina Kneisley was a national and world roller skating champion in pairs and ladies freestyle, and Scott Duncan was a WUSA National Champion in wrestling.

Education

Public schools
Most of Marion is served by the Marion City School District, which enrolls 4,242 students in public primary and secondary schools, as of the 2022–23 school year, and the district's average testing ranking is 3/10, which is in the bottom 50% of public schools in Ohio. The district administers six elementary schools, one middle school, and one high school, Marion Harding High School. Parts of the city are in the neighboring Elgin Local, Pleasant Local, Ridgedale Local, and River Valley Local School Districts.

Tri-Rivers Educational Computer Association (TRECA) Digital Academy, an online public school for Ohio students in grades K–12, is headquartered in Marion. Operated by TRECA, the school provides students in many school districts in Ohio with distance learning options.

Parochial schools
Marion is home to one parochial school, St. Mary's School, which includes grades K–8 and is affiliated with the Roman Catholic Diocese of Columbus.

Vocational education
Marion is also home to Tri-Rivers Career Center and Center for Adult Education offering career technical educations to high school and adult students in Central Ohio. Tri-Rivers is the site for RAMTEC—the Robotics & Advanced Manufacturing Technology Education Collaborative.

Higher education
Marion is home to two institutions of higher learning:
Ohio State University, Marion Campus, a regional campus of The Ohio State University
Marion Technical College, a community college that shares the OSU Marion Campus
Tri-Rivers Career Center, a career and trade school which in recent years, built a trade school addition focused on robotics, generally aimed towards the same robotics used in auto manufacturing.

Libraries
The Marion Public Library is the city's main public library.

The Marion Campus Library of the OSU Marion Campus contains over 48,000 books, a large reference collection, and over 300 subscriptions. The library collection also includes print periodical indexes, microforms, maps, newspapers, pamphlet file, special collections in careers and children's literature, and the Warren G. Harding/Norman Thomas Research Collection. It provides access to all the resources of the Ohio State University and Ohio Link.

Transportation
The Marion Municipal Airport is located three nautical miles (4 mi, 6 km) northeast of the central business district.

Transportation services are available from local air charter companies and taxi services. Also, Marion had a Greyhound Bus terminal, however it was taken out and is now a transport hub for  city transportation only. 

U.S. Route 23 runs north to Findlay and Upper Sandusky and other points north from the eastern edge of Marion; and it runs south towards Columbus and other points south. Ohio state routes 4, 309 and 423 run through the city.

Into the 1960s several railroads made stops at Marion Union Station; the station's last long-distance trains (Erie Lackawanna's Lake Cities) which left in 1970 and a connecting line to the Chesapeake and Ohio Railway's George Washington which ended with the hand over of passenger service to Amtrak in 1971.

Landmarks

Harding Home

The Harding Home was the residence of Warren G. Harding, twenty-ninth president of the United States. Harding and his future wife, Florence, designed the Queen Anne Style house in 1890, a year before their marriage. They were married there and lived there for 30 years before his election to the presidency.

Harding Memorial (Harding Tomb)

The Harding Memorial, as it was called by thousands of people, including schoolchildren who donated to its construction fund, is the burial location (tomb) of the 29th President of the United States, Warren G. Harding and First Lady Florence Kling Harding. Later referred to as the Harding Tomb, it is located at the southeast corner of Vernon Heights Boulevard and Delaware Avenue. Construction began in 1926 and was finished in early 1927, the Greek temple structure is built of white marble. Designed by Henry Hornbostel, Eric Fisher Wood and Edward Mellon, the structure is 103 feet in diameter and 53 feet in height. The open design honors the Hardings' wishes that they be buried outside.

Hotel Harding (The Harding Centre)
Constructed in 1924, the Hotel Harding was developed to provide lodging and fine dining for the expected post-White House visitors of President Harding. It was hoped by local entrepreneurs that the hotel would provide lodging for Warren G. Harding's visitors who came to Marion after his presidency. It was located close to Union Station, the city's main rail station.  The building is no longer used as a hotel. Renovated in 2005, the building is now an apartment style community for all, and as residence for OSUM students. Its lobby has been restored to much the same condition as the original.

Marion Cemetery
Merchant Family Memorial (The Rotating Ball). Marion Cemetery is the home to the Merchant family grave marker, known for its unintended movements. The marker consists of a large grey granite pedestal capped by a two-ton granite sphere four feet in diameter. The sphere moves on its base a 1/4 to a 1/2 inch every year, as measured by the distance traveled by the unpolished spot from where it was mated to the pedestal. While the movement of the sphere is thought to be facilitated by freeze-thaw cycles, earth tremors, or trapped air or water under the base, there has been no conclusive explanation for patterns that the sphere seems to follow. The movements of the sphere have been documented by numerous news outlets and it has been featured in Ripley's Believe it or Not (September 29, 1927). This has also been documented in Frank Edwards' book, Strange World, from an edition in the early to mid sixties. There are several web pages on the internet concerning this tombstone.

The Receiving Vault. The Marion Cemetery Receiving Vault is a funerary structure in the main cemetery of Marion, Ohio, United States. Constructed in the 1870s, this receiving vault originally fulfilled the normal purposes of such structures, but it gained prominence as the semipermanent resting place of Marion's most prominent citizen, U.S. President Warren G. Harding.

Notable people
Marion is both the hometown and burial location of President Warren G. Harding and First Lady Florence Harding. It is also the birthplace and childhood home of Norman Mattoon Thomas, six-time candidate for President of the United States under the Socialist Party of America ticket and co-founder of the American Civil Liberties Union (ACLU).

Harding's sister, Carolyn Harding Votaw, also lived in Marion. During Harding's administration, she was appointed to head the social service division of the U.S. Public Health Service, while her husband was named Superintendent of Prisons and chairman of the boards of parole at each institution. Mrs. Votaw also served as an advisor to the Federal Board of Vocation Education within the Veterans’ Bureau, which caused her name to arise during testimony in the successful prosecution of the Bureau's director, Charles R. Forbes, on corruption charges.

Elsie Janis, the Broadway musical theatre star, Hollywood screenwriter, composer and actress, and "Sweetheart of the American Expeditionary Forces" (AEF) during World War I, was a native of Marion County.

In 1938, local tap dance instructor Marilyn Meseke, was crowned Miss America 1938—the first year that talent was considered part of the annual competition.

Mary Ellen Withrow (née Hinamon), Treasurer of the United States from 1994 until 2001 is a Marion County native. Withrow is the only person in the history of the United States to have held the governmental position of Treasurer on the local (Marion County Ohio Treasurer), state (Treasurer of the State of Ohio) and Federal levels of Government.

Jim Thorpe spent time in Marion County as the coach and lead player for the Native American-led National Football League Oorang Indians. While the team was based in LaRue the Indians played at "home" in Marion.

Other notable people who lived in Marion include:

 Brian Agler, former head coach of basketball's Columbus Quest and current head coach for the Los Angeles Sparks
 Bob Allen (shortstop) (1867–1943), shortstop for the Philadelphia Phillies, Boston Beaneaters, and Cincinnati Reds, manager with the Phillies and Reds; as a youth, he played baseball with Warren G. Harding
 Eber Baker, founder of Marion
 Larry Barnett, umpire 1969-1999 Major League Baseball; worked infamous Game 3 of 1975 World Series and 1996 American League Championship Series that involved fan young fan Jeffrey Maier
 James A. Beckel, Jr., composer
 Ozias Bowen (1805–1871) was an Ohio Supreme Court Judge 1856–1858; his residence is owned by the Marion County Historical Association, which operates it as the Stengel-True Museum
 Nan Britton, author of The President's Daughter and mother of President Warren G. Harding's only child
 George H. Busby, member of the U.S. House of Representatives
 Jack (John) Cade, Civil War spy, who had a bounty placed on his head by the Confederate Army
 John Courtright, pitcher at Duke and first professional pitcher to face Michael Jordan in the minor leagues; pitched in one Major League game May 6, 1995 for the Cincinnati Reds
 Daniel Richard Crissinger, Chairman of the Federal Reserve Board and 14th Comptroller of the Currency
 John Dean, lawyer, Nixon Administration official, Watergate key witness, historian on Warren G. Harding, and critic of President Donald Trump
 Jeanne Dietsch, New Hampshire state senator; former tech entrepreneur
 James H. Godman, Ohio state auditor (1864–1872)
 Shawn Grate, convicted serial killer
 Tommy Griffith, player for Cincinnati Reds
 Toby Harrah, MLB player, 4-time All-Star, coach with the Detroit Tigers
 Steven Hicks, front office, Minnesota Vikings
 George Hogan, baseball player
 Edward Huber, industrialist and inventor of the gasoline-powered tractor
 Aubrey Huff, baseball player
 Elsie Janis, early 20th Century singer, songwriter, actress, and screenwriter. First female announcer for the NBC radio network.
 John A. Key, member of House of Representatives
 Florence Kling DeWolfe Harding, wife of Warren G. Harding, First Lady of the United States, 1921–1923
 Huey Lewis, singer and songwriter, lived in Marion from 1951 to 1957
 Ed McCants, basketball player, college All American and Horizon League player of the year 2000, University of Wisconsin Milwaukee "All Decade Team" (2000)
 Walter McClaskey, member Ohio House of Representatives
 O.J. McDuffie, football player, wide receiver for Penn State and NFL's Miami Dolphins
 Rick Mills, glass artist
 Steve Mills, juggler 
 Grant E. Mouser, U.S. House of Representatives (1905–1909), who in 1905 and 1906 added a total of $95,000 in appropriations to build the Old Post Office
 Grant E. Mouser Jr., U.S. House of Representatives (1929–1933)
 Gerry Mulligan, saxophonist, composer, jazz artist also known as "Jeru"
 Taya Parker, model
 George Pfann, football coach, elected to the College Football Hall of Fame
 Carrie Phillips, mistress of Warren G. Harding, only woman known to have blackmailed a major American political party successfully
 Aron Ralston Outdoorsman. Author of Between a Rock and a Hard Place. Had a movie based on his experience called 127 Hours.
 Doug Sharp, Olympic bobsled medalist
 Bill Sims, blues musician
 Frederick C. Smith, member of House of Representatives and physician
 John Vornholt, author of Star Trek novels and screenwriter
Norman Thomas, famous socialist that ran for President 6 times unsuccessfully

References

External links

 City website
 Marion Area Convention & Visitors Bureau
 
 Marion Made

 
Cities in Ohio
Cities in Marion County, Ohio
County seats in Ohio
Populated places established in 1822
1822 establishments in Ohio
Sundown towns in Ohio